The A75 is an autoroute (motorway) in France.

It was due for completion in spring 2011, but was fully open in December 2010.

South of St. Flour there are excellent views of the Garabit viaduct.

A large portion of the A75 is also part of the European route E11.

Engineering achievements

The building of a motorway across the Massif Central is, in itself, a formidable achievement. Much of the motorway runs at an altitude in excess of 800 m (2600 ft) with 50 km in excess of 1000 m (3250 ft).

The single most impressive feature is undoubtedly the Millau Viaduct, which carries the road over the Tarn. It was constructed under a government contract with the Eiffage group, effective for 75 years. Eiffage collects tolls at agreed rates making this the only tolled part of the A75.

Other impressive features include:

Viaducts and bridges

Passes

 990 m  between junctions 24 and 25
 Col de la Fageole, 1107 m, between junctions 26 and 27
 Col des Issartets, 1121 m, the highest point on the A75, between junctions 36 and 37
 Col de la Fagette, 882 m, between junctions 40 and 41
 Col d'Engayresque, 888 m, between junctions 44 and 44.1

Tunnels
 Tunnel de Pas d'Escalette, 725 m  southbound, 830 m  northbound, between junctions 50 and 51
 Tunnel de la Vierge, 474 m, between junctions 52 and 53

The route

† The section between junctions 59 and 61 (the Pézenas by-pass) was not technically motorway and was still designated as the N9, despite the depiction on most maps. Work to upgrade the section to full motorway status was carried out between September 2013 and June 2014.

In May 2007, construction started on the final section of the A75, a connection from Pézenas to the A9 autoroute a kilometre or so east of the previous Béziers east intersection 35. The route to the south of the present D609 Pézenas-Béziers road bypassing Valros opened in February 2009. Further sections opened in spring 2010. The final section, a gap between Valros and Servian, was completed in December 2010. According to Serge Cuculière, construction operations manager, the delay was due to difficulties encountered on the section ("Les difficultés recontrées sur la section exigent un temps de réalisation plus important").

References

External links

La Meridienne official website (French) (2013 copy from WayBack Machine: tourist information
A75 autoroute at Saratlas (Note: The distances on this site are inaccurate)
Rest areas on the magnificent A75 autoroute  Three noteworthy areas described. Photo illustrations, sketch maps.

Autoroutes in France